The following lists events that happened during 2001 in Croatia.

Incumbents
President: Stjepan Mesić
Prime Minister: Ivica Račan
Speaker: Zlatko Tomčić

Events
 March 28 – Chamber of Counties is abolished.
 December 3 – USKOK is founded.

Arts and literature
 June 30 –Slow Surrender wins the Big Golden Arena for Best Film at the 48th Pula Film Festival.

Sport
 July 9 – Goran Ivanišević wins the Wimbledon Men's Singles title.

Deaths
 January 1 – Fabijan Šovagović, actor (born 1932)
 January 28 – Ranko Marinković, writer (born 1913)
 February 6 – Miro Kačić, linguist (born 1946)
 February 17 – Zvonimir Červenko, general (born 1926)
 July 3 – Ivan Slamnig, poet (born 1930)
 September 5 – Vladimir Žerjavić, economist (born 1912)
 November 6 – Sveto Letica, admiral (born 1926)

See also
2001 in Croatian television

References

 
Years of the 21st century in Croatia
Croatia
Croatia
2000s in Croatia